Shelby Community Airport  is a privately owned, public use airport located two nautical miles (4 km) west of the central business district of Shelby, in Richland County, Ohio, United States.

Facilities and aircraft 
Shelby Community Airport covers an area of 50 acres (20 ha) at an elevation of 1,120 feet (341 m) above mean sea level. It has two runways: 18/36 is 3,174 by 50 feet (967 x 15 m) with an asphalt surface and 3/21 is 1,890 by 125 feet (576 x 38 m) with a turf surface.

For the 12-month period ending July 19, 2010, the airport had 2,012 aircraft operations, an average of 167 per month: 99% general aviation and 1% air taxi. At that time there were 12 aircraft based at this airport: 92% single-engine and 8% ultralight.

References

External links 
 Shelby Airport (12G)
 Aerial image as of March 1995 from USGS The National Map
 

Airports in Ohio
Transportation in Richland County, Ohio